The men's 50 metre freestyle competition of the swimming events at the 2015 World Aquatics Championships was held on 7 August with the heats and the semifinals and 8 August with the final.

Despite losing lane four to American Nathan Adrian, France's Florent Manaudou threw down a personal and textile best of 21.19 to win his first World Championship in the event, holding off Adrian and Brazilian Bruno Fratus by over three-tenths of a second, an enormous margin in swimming's shortest race.  Adrian grabbed the silver in 21.52, following up a new American Record of 21.37 achieved earlier in the semifinals.  Fratus took home the bronze, his first World Championship medal ever, in 21.55.  Vladimir Morozov, the defending silver medalist from Barcelona, missed the podium in fourth place by a fingertip in 21.56.  Ukraine's Andriy Hovorov and Italy's Marco Orsi tied for fifth in 21.86, while Greece's Kristian Golomeev, the defending NCAA 100 freestyle champion, took seventh in 21.98.  Great Britain's Benjamin Proud finished eight in 22.04 to round out the championship final.

Plagued by injury, Brazil's defending World Champion César Cielo scratched the event.  Other notable swimmers included China's Ning Zetao (22.18) and American Anthony Ervin (22.02), who both missed the championship final.

Records
Prior to the competition, the existing world and championship records were as follows.

Results

Heats
The heats were held at 09:30.

Semifinals
The semifinals were held at 18.09.

Semifinal 1

Semifinal 2

Swim-off
The swim-off was held at 19:38.

Final
The final was held on 8 August at 17:39.

References

Men's 50 metre freestyle